Anacrehill is an area of Snelston parish, to the south of the village. The area contains a small number of cottages and farmhouses located on Virginsalley Lane.

Hamlets in Derbyshire
Derbyshire Dales